Short transient receptor potential channel 5 (TrpC5) also known as transient receptor protein 5 (TRP-5) is a protein that in humans is encoded by the TRPC5 gene. TrpC5 is subtype of the TRPC family of mammalian transient receptor potential ion channels.

Function 

TrpC5 is one of the seven mammalian TRPC (transient receptor potential canonical) proteins. TrpC5 is a multi-pass membrane protein and is thought to form a receptor-activated non-selective calcium permeant cation channel. The protein is active alone or as a heteromultimeric assembly with TRPC1, TRPC3, and TRPC4. It also interacts with multiple proteins including calmodulin, CABP1, enkurin, Na+–H+ exchange regulatory factor (NHERF), interferon-induced GTP-binding protein (MX1), ring finger protein 24 (RNF24), and SEC14 domain and spectrin repeat-containing protein 1 (SESTD1).

TRPC4 and TRPC5 have been implicated in the mechanism of mercury toxicity and neurological behavior. It was established in 2021 that TRPC5 is a component of the dental cold sensing system.

Activation 

Homomultimeric TRPC5 and heteromultimeric TRPC5-TRPC1 channels are activated by extracellular reduced thioredoxin. This channel has also been found to be involved in the action of anaesthetics such as chloroform, halothane and propofol.

Interactions 

TRPC5 has been shown to interact with STMN3, TRPC1, and TRPC4.

See also 
 TRPC

References

Further reading

External links 
 

Ion channels